Li Peng (born 29 August 1990) is a Chinese professional footballer who currently plays for Chinese Super League club Wuhan Yangtze River.

Club career
Li joined Shandong Luneng Taishan Football School in 2003. He was loaned to Xinjiang Sport Lottery in 2008 for the 2008 China League Two campaign. He transferred to Chinese Super League side Qingdao Jonoon in March 2010. On 22 August 2010, he made his debut for Qingdao Jonoon in a Super League match which Qingdao lost to Jiangsu Sainty 4–0, coming on as a substitute for Lee Yoon-Sub in the 25th minute. On 12 September 2010, he scored his first Super League goal in his second appearance, which ensured Qingdao beat Shenzhen Ruby 4–3.

On 1 December 2016, Li moved to Super League side Shanghai Shenhua. He made his debut for Shanghai on 11 March 2017 in a 1–1 home draw against Tianjin Quanjian, coming on for Li Jianbin in the 57th minute.

Career statistics 
Statistics accurate as of match played 22 January 2022.

Honours

Club
Shanghai Shenhua
Chinese FA Cup: 2017, 2019

References

External links
 

1990 births
Living people
Sportspeople from Handan
Association football defenders
Chinese footballers
Footballers from Hebei
Qingdao Hainiu F.C. (1990) players
Shanghai Shenhua F.C. players
Nantong Zhiyun F.C. players
Chinese Super League players
China League One players
China League Two players